Lathe may refer to:

In woodworking and metalworking
Geometric lathe, used for making ornamental patterns on the plates used in printing bank notes and postage stamps
Lathe (metal), a lathe used specifically for metals
Lathe, used in turning wood, metals and other materials
Rose engine lathe, a specialized kind of ornamental lathe

Other uses
Disc cutting lathe, the groove cutting machine used in the production of vinyl records
Lathe (county subdivision), formerly an administrative division of the county of Kent, England
Lathe (graphics), a method of forming 3D computer graphics
Learning and teaching in higher education (LATHE), and hence the diploma awarded by the University of Oxford, PGDipLATHE

See also
Lath, material used to span gaps in structural framing and form a base on which to apply plaster